Pierre Bremond (born 18 June 1958) is a French sports shooter. He competed in the men's 10 metre air pistol event at the 1988 Summer Olympics.

References

External links
 

1958 births
Living people
French male sport shooters
Olympic shooters of France
Shooters at the 1988 Summer Olympics
People from Arles
Sportspeople from Bouches-du-Rhône
20th-century French people